Henry Kamm (born June 3, 1925, in Breslau, Germany (now Wroclaw, Poland)) was a correspondent for The New York Times. He reported for the Times from Southeast Asia (based in Bangkok), Europe, the Middle East and Africa.

In 1969, Kamm won the George Polk Award for Foreign Reporting.

Kamm won the Pulitzer Prize for International Reporting in 1978 for his coverage of the plight of refugees from Indochina.

Bibliography
 Dragon Ascending: Vietnam and the Vietnamese. Arcade Publishing, 1996.  
 Cambodia: Report from a Stricken Land. Arcade Publishing, 1998.

Notes

1925 births
Living people
20th-century American journalists
American male journalists
George Polk Award recipients
Pulitzer Prize for International Reporting winners
The New York Times writers
Place of birth missing (living people)